Al Mahrah, or simply Mahra, is a governorate (muhafazah) of Yemen in the southern part of the Arabian Peninsula. Situated in the area of the former Mahra Sultanate, its capital is Al Ghaydah, and it has international borders with Saudi Arabia and Oman.

Languages and people
A sizeable part of the Mahrah population does not speak Arabic as their primary language. Non-Arabic-speakers primarily speak Mehri or Mahri, which is a Modern South Arabian language, similar to the adjacent Dhofar Governorate of Oman. The people that speak Mahri call themselves 'Mahris', and are presumed to be descendants of the ancient people of 'Ad.

Geography
The geography of Al-Mahrah is similar to that of neighboring Dhofar in Oman. Along its coast near the border with Oman, Al Mahrah is affected by the seasonal monsoon, or Khareef. The mountains become water-soaked and the atmosphere becomes moist and foggy as vegetation turns the barren coast into lush valleys and forests. Hauf National Park is located in Al-Mahrah.

The mountains here are referred to as either the "Mahrat" or "Hadhramaut".

Adjacent governorates

 Hadhramaut Governorate (west)
 Dhofar Governorate, Oman (east)

History

Yemeni Civil War
The governorate has remained relatively untouched by the civil war in Yemen that began in 2015.

On 10 September 2016, three militants in the Al Mahrah governorate declared on social media the formation of a new wilayat, or state, belonging to the Islamic State of Iraq and the Levant (ISIL). However, official ISIL media did not acknowledge the declaration.

From 2015 to late 2017, Al Mahrah was under the control of the Yemeni 123rd and 137th Mechanized Brigades. From mid-November 2017 onwards, Saudi Arabia began increasing its presence in the governorate, taking control of facilities, Nishtun port, the Sarfit and Shehen border crossings, and al-Gaydah Airport, while establishing military outposts around key infrastructure and coastal areas. On 27 November 2017, Mohammed Abdullah Kuddah, the governor of Al Mahrah, was replaced by Rajeh Said Bakrit, following the former's objections to Saudi influence.

Districts
Al Mahrah Governorate is divided into the following 10 districts. These districts are further divided into sub-districts, and then further subdivided into villages:

 Al Ghaydah District
 Al Masilah District
 Hat District
 Hawf District
 Huswain District
 Man'ar District
 Qishn District 
 Sayhut District
 Shahan District
 Rimah District

See also
 The Hadhramaut Governorate – nearby

References

 
Governorates of Yemen